The Visayan shama (Copsychus superciliaris) is a species of bird in the family Muscicapidae.
It is endemic to Ticao, Masbate, Negros, and Panay in the Philippines. It formerly considered a subspecies of the white-browed shama (Copsychus luzoniensis).

Description 
Described on ebird as "A medium-sized, long-tailed bird... Black on the upperparts and tail, with a white belly and pale pink legs. Male has a black throat and chest. Female has a rufous patch on the rump and lower back, and a white throat with a black breast band. Somewhat similar to Philippine magpie-robin, but has a long white eyebrow and no white wing patch. Heard more often than seen. Gives a very varied song, with loud melodic whistles, warbling trills, and repeated loud “chew chew chew!” notes."

Habitat 
Its natural habitat is moist tropical primary and secondary forest up to 1,000 meters above sea level.

References

Visayan shama
Endemic birds of the Philippines
Fauna of the Visayas
Visayan shama
Taxa named by Frank Swift Bourns
Taxa named by Dean Conant Worcester